The 2022–23 Sint-Truidense V.V. season is the club's 99th season in existence and the eighth consecutive season in the top flight of Belgian football. In addition to the domestic league, Sint-Truiden will participate in this season's edition of the Belgian Cup. The season covers the period from 1 July 2022 to 30 June 2023.

Players

First-team squad

Other players under contract

On loan

Pre-season and friendlies

Competitions

Overview

Belgian Pro League

League table

Results summary

Results by round

Matches
The league fixtures were announced on 22 June 2022.

Belgian Cup

References

Sint-Truidense V.V.